The Knob may refer to:

 The Knob (Indiana)
 The Knob (Montana), a mountain in Custer County, Montana
 The Knob (South Georgia)
 The Knob (New York)

See also
 List of geographical knobs
 Knob (disambiguation)